Rakchham is a village in Sangla Valley in the Kinnaur district of Himachal Pradesh state of India.

See also 
 Sangla Valley

External links 
 Sangla Valley Travelblog
 Baspa Valley blog

References 

Villages in Kinnaur district